Badasahi or Barsahi s a community development block that forms an administrative division in Baripada subdivision of Mayurbhanj district in the Indian state of Odisha. The block has six RI circles, i.e. (1) Pratappur (2) Khanua (3) Sankerko (4) Kuradiha (5) Durgapur (6) Manatri. Inhabited by around two lakh people and distributed in 30 panchayats and 224 revenue villages.

References

Mayurbhanj district
Community development blocks in Odisha